Kleszczów  (formerly German Klüschau) is a village in the administrative district of Gmina Rudziniec, within Gliwice County, Silesian Voivodeship, in southern Poland.

The village has a population of 781.

References

 

Villages in Gliwice County